Gaston Gélibert (1850 – 1931) was a French painter. His work was part of the painting event in the art competition at the 1928 Summer Olympics.

References

1850 births
1931 deaths
20th-century French painters
20th-century French male artists
French male painters
Olympic competitors in art competitions
19th-century French male artists